Mortefontaine is the name or part of the name of several communes in France:

 Mortefontaine, Aisne, in the Aisne département
 Mortefontaine, Oise, in the Oise département
 Mortefontaine-en-Thelle, in the Oise département